Pigskin Champions is a 1937 sports short subject documentary directed by Charles G. Clarke and Produced by Metro-Goldwyn-Mayer. It featured the then-World Champion Green Bay Packers in an exhibition of football skills. It premiered in Green Bay, Wisconsin on August 13, 1937. The film featured prominent players from the team, such as Curly Lambeau, Arnie Herber, and Clarke Hinkle, performing difficult passes and kicks, as well as various workouts and drills.

References

Sources

Bibliography

External links
 

1930s sports films
1937 documentary films
1937 films
American black-and-white films
American sports documentary films
Documentary films about American football
Films produced by Pete Smith (film producer)
History of the Green Bay Packers
Films shot in Wisconsin
1930s American films